Anthony (Tony) Sibley was a successful New Zealand soccer player who frequently represented his country in the 1970s and 1980s.

He finished his playing career for the All Whites with 48 A-international caps to his credit.

In 1978 Sibley was awarded New Zealand soccer player of the year. Sibley is one of only two players to have appeared in eight Chatham Cup finals.

References

External links

1950 births
Living people
New Zealand association footballers
New Zealand international footballers
Association football defenders
1973 Oceania Cup players
1980 Oceania Cup players